The Pinky and Perky Show is a 2008 revival of Pinky and Perky. It stars the two anthropomorphic pigs. It is in full CGI and produced by method Films, Picture Production Company, Telegael and in association with Pinky and Perky Enterprises. 52 episodes were produced.

Plot 
The show stars the Pigs named Pinky and Perky, together they run their children's show called The Pinky and Perky Show. Together they handle different situations whether being bringing a band back together, trying to get the most stickers and even finding lost treasure. Pinky is the kind hearted pig and animator of the cartoon "The Adventures of Power Pig and Porker" while his other brother Perky is spoilt and takes things for granted.

Setting 
Unlike the original puppet series, the show is set in a world of anthropomorphic animals, such as K.T., a cat who serves as the show organizer; Wilberforce, a turtle who works as the security guard; Vera, a fox who hosts a morning show; and Eric, a dog who serves as Vera's co-host. Each episode takes place in the PPCTV Studio.

Cast 
 David Holt as Pinky
 Duncan Wisbey as Perky
 Teresa Gallagher as KT
 Jimmy Hibbert as Wilberforce
 Ella Kenion as Tara & Vera
 Steve Brody as Eric
 Kevin Bishop as Powerpig & Porker and various comedy cameos
 Mike Hayley as Sir Percival
 Renton Skinner as Morton Frog

Minor 
 Niky Wardley as Tamara
 Mark Perry as Simon Cow
 Jessica Robinson as various comedy cameos
 Lizzie Roper as various comedy cameos

Production 
The show is produced by DQ Entertainment, Method Animation, Picture Production Company, Telegael and in association with Pinky and Perky Enterprises. It is distributed worldwide by Granada International. One series has been produced so far with 52 episodes.

Episodes

Home media 
A DVD has been released by the Australian Broadcasting Company and the British Broadcasting Corporation called Licence to Swill and contains 8 episodes from the series. ITV Studios Another DVD will be released in September 2010 entitled Cartoon Mashup.

References

External links 
 
 

BBC children's television shows
British computer-animated television series
French computer-animated television series
2008 British television series debuts
2008 French television series debuts
2000s French animated television series
2010s French animated television series
British children's animated comedy television series
French children's animated comedy television series
Television series by Method Animation